Henry George Walker (7 August 1892 – 24 November 1982) was an Australian rules footballer who played with Richmond in the Victorian Football League (VFL).

Notes

External links 

1892 births
1982 deaths
Australian rules footballers from Melbourne
Richmond Football Club players
People from Hawthorn, Victoria